Andrew Wen-Chuan Lo (born 1960) is the Charles E. and Susan T. Harris Professor of Finance at the MIT Sloan School of Management. Lo is the author of many academic articles in finance and financial economics. He founded AlphaSimplex Group in 1999 and served as chairman and chief investment strategist until 2018 when he transitioned to his current role as chairman emeritus and senior advisor.

Career
Lo is a professor of finance at the MIT Sloan School of Management, the director of MIT's Laboratory for Financial Engineering, a principal investigator at MIT's Computer Science and Artificial Intelligence Laboratory, an affiliated faculty of the MIT Department of Electrical Engineering and Computer Science, an external faculty member of the Santa Fe Institute, and a research associate of the National Bureau of Economic Research. He previously taught at the University of Pennsylvania's Wharton School from 1984 to 1988.

He is the founder of AlphaSimplex Group, a quantitative investment management company based in Cambridge, Massachusetts, and served as its chairman and chief investment strategist until 2018 when he transitioned to his current role as chairman emeritus and senior advisor. AlphaSimplex specializes in quantitative global macro and global tactical asset allocation strategies, beta-replication products, and absolute-return risk analytics.

Lo presented a paper in 2004 at a National Bureau of Economic Research conference, warning of "the rising systematic risk to financial markets and particularly focused on the potential liquidity, leverage and counterparty risk from hedge funds.” He testified in 2008 before the Committee on Oversight and Government Reform and the Committee on Financial Services of the U.S. House of Representatives on Hedge Funds, Systemic Risk, and the Financial Crisis of 2007–2008. With Lars Peter Hansen, Lo co-directed the Macro Financial Modeling project at the Becker Friedman Institute, a network of macroeconomists working to develop improved models of the linkages between the financial and real sectors of the economy in the wake of the 2008 financial crisis.

Lo was a founding co-editor of the Annual Review of Financial Economics, serving from 2009 to 2021. and advisor to the Journal of Investment Management and The Journal of Portfolio Management. He is also a director of Roivant Sciences.

Awards
His awards include Batterymarch, Guggenheim, and Sloan fellowships; the Paul A. Samuelson Award; the Eugene Fama Prize; the IAFE-SunGard Financial Engineer of the Year award; the Global Association of Risk Professionals' Risk Manager of the Year award; the Harry M. Markowitz Award; the Managed Futures Pinnacle Achievement Award; one of Time magazine's "100 most influential people in the world"; and awards for teaching excellence from both Wharton and MIT. His most recent book, Adaptive Markets: Financial Evolution at the Speed of Thought, has also received a number of awards. Lo is a fellow of Academia Sinica, the American Academy of Arts and Sciences, the Econometric Society, and the Society of Financial Econometrics.

Personal life
Lo received a Bachelor of Arts in economics from Yale University where he graduated in 1980 and a Ph.D. in economics from Harvard University graduating in 1984. He was raised by his mother in a single parent household. He speaks fluent Cantonese.

Publications

References

External links
 
 Becker Friedman Institute - Macro Financial Modeling
 Profile on BFI
 Profile on MIT Sloan
 Profile on Expertise Guide
 Selected publications
 Papers on Social Science Research Network (SSRN)
 Profile on Alpha Simplex
 
  Alt URL
 
 

Financial economists
Living people
1960 births
Hong Kong people
Yale University alumni
Harvard University alumni
MIT Sloan School of Management faculty
Hong Kong emigrants to the United States
American people of Chinese descent
Fellows of the Econometric Society
Fellows of the American Academy of Arts and Sciences
Annual Reviews (publisher) editors